A system of plant taxonomy, the Wettstein system recognised the following main groups, according to Richard Wettstein's  Handbuch der Systematischen Botanik (1901–1924).

3rd edition (1924)

Outline 
Synopsis
 Flagellatae p. 65
 Myxophyta p. 69
 Schizophyta
 Schizophyceae
 Schizomycetes
 Zygophyta
 Peridinieae
 Bacillarieae
 Centricae
 Pennatae
 Conjugatae
 Phaeophytae
 Rhodophyta
 Bangieae
 Florideae
 Euphallophyta
 Chlorophyceae
 Fungi
 Eumycetes
 Phycomycetes
 Ascomycetes
 Basidiomycetes
 Lichenes
 Ascolichenes
 Basidiolichenes
 Cormophyta
 Archegoniatae
 Bryophyta
 Musci
 Hepaticae
 Pteridophyta
 Psilophytinae
 Lycopodiinae
 Psilotinae
 Equisetinae
 Isoëtinae
 Filicinae
 Cycadofilicinae
 Anthophyta
 Gymnospermae
 Cycadinae
 Bennettitinae
 Cordaitinae
 Gingkoinae
 Coniferae
 Gnetinae
 Angiospermae p. 467
 Dicotyledones p. 539
 Choripetalae
 Monochlamydeae p. 540
 Dialypetalae
 Sympetalae
 Monocotyledones p. 848

Scheme 
 Flagellatae p. 65
 I. phylum Schizophyta
 1. classis Schizophyceae
 2. classis Schizomycetes
 II. phylum Monadophyta
 III. phylum Myxophyta p. 69
 IV. phylum Conjugatophyta
 V. phylum Bacillariophyta
 VI. phylum Conjugatae
 VII. phylum Rhodophyta
 1. classis Bang|1924|loc=[]ieae
 2. classis Florideae
 VIII. phylum Euthallophyta
 1. classis Chlorophyceae
 2. classis Fungi
A. Eumycetes
 1. subclassis Phycomycetes
 2. subclassis Ascomycetes
 3. subclassis Basidiomycetes
B. Lichenes
 1. subclassis Ascolichenes
 2. subclassis Basidiolichenes
 IX. phylum Cormophyta
 I. divisio Archegoniatae

Bryophyta 
 1. subdivisio Bryophyta
 1. classis Musci
 2. classis Hepaticae

Pteridophyta 
 2. subdivisio Pteridophyta
 1. classis Psilophytinae
 2. classis Lycopodiinae
 3. classis Psilotinae
 4. classis Articulatae
 5. classis Filicinae
 II. divisio Anthophyta
 1. subdivisio Gymnospermae
 1. classis Pteridospermae
 2. classis Cycadinae
 3. classis Benettitinae
 4. classis Cordaïtinae
 5. classis Ginkgoinae
 6. classis Coniferae
 7. classis Gnetinae
 2. subdivisio Angiospermae
 1. classis Dicotyledones
 1. subclassis Choripetalae
 A. Monochlamideae
 B. Dialypetalae
 2. subclassis Sympetalae
 2. classis Monocotyledones

Gymnospermae
1. subdivisio Gymnospermae
 1. classis Pteridospermae (fossil only)
 2. classis Cycadinae
 1. familia Cycadaceae 
 2. familia Zamiaceae
 3. classis Benettitinae (fossil only)
 4. classis Cordaïtinae (fossil only)
 5. classis Ginkgoinae
 1. familia Ginkgoaceae
 6. classis Coniferae
 1. familia Taxaceae
 2. familia Cupressaceae
 3. familia Abietaceae
 7. classis Gnetinae
 1. familia Ephedraceae 
 2. familia Gnetaceae
 3. familia Welwitschiaceae

Angiospermae
2. subdivisio Angiospermae p. 467

Dicotyledones
 1. classis Dicotyledones  p. 539
 1. subclassis Choripetalae 
 A. Monochlamydeae  p. 540
 1. ordo Verticillatae
 familia Casuarinaceae
 2. ordo Fagales
 1. familia Betulaceae
 2. familia Fagaceae
 3. ordo Myricales
 familia Myricaceae
 4. ordo Leitneriales
 familia Leitneriaceae
 5. ordo Juglandales
 1. familia Julianiaceae
 2. familia Juglandaceae
 6. ordo Salicales
 familia Salicaceae
 7. ordo Batidales
 familia Batidaceae [sic, now Bataceae]
 8. ordo Balanopsidales
 familia Balanopsidaceae [sic, now Balanopaceae]
 9. ordo Urticales
 1. familia Moraceae
 2. familia Cannabaceae
 3. familia Ulmaceae
 4. familia Eucommiaceae
 5. familia Rhoipteleaceae
 6. familia Urticaceae
10. ordo Piperales
 familia Piperaceae
 incertae sedis
 familia Saururaceae
 familia Chloranthaceae
 familia Lacistemonaceae
11. ordo Proteales
 familia Proteaceae
12. ordo Santalales
 1. familia Santalaceae
 2. familia Grubbiaceae
 3. familia Opiliaceae
 4. familia Octoknemaceae
 5. familia Olacaceae
 6. familia Myzodendraceae
 7. familia Loranthaceae
 8. familia Balanophoraceae
 9. familia Cynomoriaceae
13. ordo Polygonales
 familia Polygonaceae
14. ordo Centrospermae
 1. familia Chenopodiaceae
 2. familia Amaranthaceae
 3. familia Phytolaccaceae
 4. familia Thelygonaceae
 5. familia Nyctaginaceae
 6. familia Aizoaceae
 7. familia Cactaceae 
[sic]
 9. familia Portulacaceae
10. familia Basellaceae
11. familia Caryophyllaceae
15. ordo Tricoccae
 1. familia Euphorbiaceae
 2. familia Daphniphyllaceae
 3. familia Dichapetalaceae
 4. familia Buxaceae
 5. familia Callitrichaceae
16. ordo Hamamelidales
 1. familia Hamamelidaceae
 2. familia Cercidiphyllaceae
 3. familia Eupteleaceae
 4. familia Platanaceae
 5. familia Myrothamnaceae
 [sic]
 B. Dialypetalae 
18. ordo Polycarpicae
 1. familia Magnoliaceae
 2. familia Trochodendraceae
 3. familia Lactoridaceae
 4. familia Himantandraceae
 5. familia Eupomatiaceae
 6. familia Anonaceae [sic, now: Annonaceae]
 7. familia Myristicaceae
 8. familia Canellaceae
 9. familia Aristolochiaceae
10. familia Rafflesiaceae
11. familia Hydnoraceae
12. familia Calycanthaceae
13. familia Gomortegaceae
14. familia Monimiaceae
15. familia Lauraceae
16. familia Hernandiaceae
17. familia Menispermaceae
18. familia Lardizabalaceae
19. familia Ranunculaceae
20. familia Berberidaceae
21. familia Nymphaeaceae
22. familia Ceratophyllaceae
 incertae sedis
23. familia Nepenthaceae
24. familia Cephalotaceae
25. familia Sarraceniaceae
19. ordo Rhoeadales
 1. familia Papaveraceae
 2. familia Tovariaceae 
 3. familia Capparidaceae [sic, now Capparaceae]
 4. familia Cruciferae
 5. familia Resedaceae
 6. familia Moringaceae
20. ordo Parietales
 1. familia Cistaceae
 2. familia Bixaceae 
 3. familia Cochlospermaceae
 4. familia Tamaricaceae
 5. familia Fouquieriaceae
 6. familia Frankeniaceae
 7. familia Elatinaceae
 8. familia Droseraceae
 9. familia Violaceae
10. familia Flacourtiaceae
11. familia Stachyuraceae
12. familia Turneraceae
13. familia Malesherbiaceae
14. familia Passifloraceae 
15. familia Achariaceae
16. familia Caricaceae
17. familia Loasaceae
18. familia Begoniaceae
19. familia Datiscaceae
20. familia Ancistrocladaceae
21. ordo Guttiferales
 1. familia Dilleniaceae
 2. familia Actinidiaceae 
 3. familia Ochnaceae
 4. familia Strassburgeriaceae
 5. familia Eucryphiaceae
 6. familia Caryocaraceae
 7. familia Marcgraviaceae
 8. familia Quiinaceae
 9. familia Theaceae
10. familia Guttiferae
11. familia Dipterocarpaceae
22. ordo Rosales
 1. familia Crassulaceae
 2. familia Saxifragaceae 
 3. familia Cunoniaceae 
 4. familia Brunelliaceae
 5. familia Myrothamnaceae
 6. familia Pittosporaceae
 7. familia Byblidaceae
 8. familia Roridulaceae
 9. familia Bruniaceae
10. familia Podostemonaceae
11. familia Hydrostachyaceae
12. familia Rosaceae
13. familia Crossosomataceae
14. familia Chrysobalanaceae
15. familia Connaraceae
16. familia Mimosaceae
17. familia Papilionaceae
23. ordo Myrtales
 1. familia Penaeaceae
 2. familia Geissolomaceae 
 3. familia Oliniaceae
 4. familia Thymelaeaceae
 5. familia Elaeagnaceae
 6. familia Lythraceae
 7. familia Heteropyzidaceae
 8. familia Sonneratiaceae
 9. familia Rhizophoraceae
10. familia Alangiaceae
11. familia Nyssaceae
12. familia Lecythidaceae
13. familia Combretaceae
14. familia Myrtaceae
15. familia Punicaceae
16. familia Melastomataceae
17. familia Oenotheraceae
18. familia Halorrhagidaceae [sic: now Haloragaceae]
19. familia Gunneraceae
 incertae sedis
 familia Hippuridaceae
24. ordo Columniferae
 1. familia Malvaceae
 2. familia Bombacaceae
 3. familia Tiliaceae
 4. familia Sterculiaceae
 5. familia Elaeocarpaceae
 incertae sedis
 familia Chlaenaceae
 familia Gonystylaceae
 familia Scytopetalaceae
25. ordo Gruinales
 1. familia Linaceae
 2. familia Humiriaceae
 3. familia Oxalidaceae
 4. familia Geraniaceae
 5. familia Limnaceae
 6. familia Tropaeolaceae
 7. familia Erythroxylaceae
 8. familia Malpighiaceae
 9. familia Zygophyllaceae
 incertae sedis
 familia Cneoraceae
26. ordo Terebinthales
 1. familia Rutaceae
 2. familia Simarubaceae [sic: now Simaroubaceae]
 3. familia Burseraceae
 4. familia Meliaceae
 5. familia Tremandraceae
 6. familia Polygalaceae
 7. familia Xanthophyllaceae
 8. familia Trigoniaceae
 9. familia Vochysiaceae
10. familia Anacardiaceae
11. familia Sapindaceae
12. familia Akaniaceae
13. familia Aextoxicaceae
14. familia Aceraceae
15. familia Hippocastanaceae
16. familia Coriaceae
17. familia Cyrillaceae
18. familia Pentaphylacaceae
19. familia Sabiaceae
20. familia Melianthaceae
21. familia Corynocarpaceae
22. familia Balsaminaceae
27. ordo Celastrales
 1. familia Aquifoliaceae
 2. familia Celastraceae
 3. familia Salvadoraceae
 4. familia Staphyleaceae
 5. familia Hippocrateaceae
 6. familia Stackhousiaceae
 7. familia Icacinaceae
28. ordo Rhamnales
 1. familia Rhamnaceae
 2. familia Vitaceae
29. ordo Umbelliflorae
 1. familia Cornaceae
 2. familia Araliaceae
 3. familia Umbelliferae
 incertae sedis
 ordo Garryales
 familia Garryaceae
 2. subclassis Sympetalae  p. 754
 1. ordo Plumbaginales
 familia Plumbaginaceae
 2. ordo Primulales
 1. familia Theophrastaceae
 2. familia Primulaceae
 3. familia Myrsinaceae
 3. ordo Bicornes
 1. familia Clethraceae
 2. familia Pirolaceae
 3. familia Ericaceae
 4. familia Empetraceae
 5. familia Epacridaceae
 6. familia Diapensiaceae
  4. ordo Diospyrales
 1. familia Ebenaceae
 2. familia Hoplestigmataceae
 3. familia Styracaceae
 4. familia Symplocaceae
 5. familia Sapotaceae
 5. ordo Tubiflorae
 1. familia Convolvulaceae
 2. familia Cuscutaceae
 3. familia Polemoniaceae
 4. familia Hydrophyllaceae
 5. familia Lennoaceae
 6. familia Boraginaceae
 7. familia Nolanaceae
 8. familia Solanaceae
 9. familia Scrophulariaceae
10. familia Lentibulariaceae
11. familia Orobranchaceae
12. familia Gesneriaceae
13. familia Bignoniaceae
14. familia Pedaliaceae
15. familia Martyniaceae
16. familia Acanthaceae
17. familia Verbenaceae
18. familia Labiatae
19. familia Tetrachondraceae
20. familia Globulariaceae
21. familia Phrymaceae
22. familia Myoporaceae
23. familia Plantaginaceae
 incertae sedis
 familia Columelliaceae
 6. ordo Contortae
 1. familia Loganiaceae
 2. familia Buddleiaceae
 3. familia Gentianaceae
 4. familia Menyanthaceae
 5. familia Apocynaceae
 6. familia Asclepiadaceae
 7. ordo Ligustrales
 familia Oleaceae
 8. ordo Rubiales
 1. familia Rubiaceae
 2. familia Caprifoliaceae
 3. familia Adoxaceae
 4. familia Valerianaceae
 5. familia Dipsacaceae
 6. familia Calyceraceae
 9. ordo Cucurbitales
 familia Cucurbitaceae
 10. ordo Synandrae
 1. familia Campanulaceae
 2. familia Lobeliaceae
 3. familia Goodeniaceae
 4. familia Stylidaceae
 5. familia Brunoniaceae
 6. familia Compositae

Monocotyledones 
 II. classis Monocotyledones  p. 848
 1. familia Alismataceae
 2. familia Butomaceae
 3. familia Hydrocharitaceae
 4. familia Scheuchzeriaceae
 5. familia Aponogetonaceae
 6. familia Potamogetonaceae
 7. familia Najadaceae
2. ordo Liliiflorae p. 862
 1. familia Liliaceae p. 863
 subfamilia A. Melanthoideae p. 866
 subfamilia B. Herrerioideae 
 subfamilia C. Asphodeloideae 
 subfamilia D. Allioideae p. 868
 subfamilia E. Lilioideae p. 869
 subfamilia F. Dracaenoideae 
 subfamilia G. Asparagoideae 
 subfamilia H. Ophiopogonoideae p. 870
 subfamilia I. Aletroideae 
 subfamilia K. Luzuriagoideae 
 subfamilia L. Smilacoideae 
 2. familia Stemonaceae p. 870
 3. familia Cyanastraceae
 4. familia Pontederiaceae
 5. familia Haemodoraceae
 6. familia Philydraceae
 7. familia Amaryllidaceae p. 871
 subfamilia A. Amaryllidoideae p. 874
 subfamilia B. Agavoideae
 subfamilia C. Hypoxidoideae
 8. familia Velloziaceae
 9. familia Iridaceae
10. familia Juncaceae
11. familia Flagellariaceae
12. familia Rapateaceae
13. familia Thurniaceae
14. familia Bromeliaceae
15. familia Dioscoreaceae p. 880
16. familia Taccaceae
17. familia Burmanniaceae p. 882
3. ordo Enantioblastae p. 883
 1. familia Commelinaceae
 2. familia Mayacaceae
 3. familia Xyridaceae
 4. familia Eriocaulaceae
 5. familia Centrolepidaceae
 6. familia Restionaceae
4. ordo Cyperales p. 888
 familia Cyperaceae
5. ordo Glumiflorae p. 891
 familia Gramineae
6. ordo Scitamineae p. 902
 1. familia Musaceae
 2. familia Zingiberaceae p. 904
 3. familia Cannaceae
 4. familia Marantaceae p. 906
7 ordo Gynandrae p. 907
 familia Orchidaceae
8. ordo Spadiciflorae
 1. familia Palmae
 2. familia Cyclanthaceae
 3. familia Araceae
 4. familia Lemnaceae
9. ordo Pandanales
 1. familia Pandanaceae
 2. familia Sparganiaceae
 3. familia Typhaceae

References

Bibliography 

 
 1st ed. 1901–1908 Vol. I 1901, Vol. II 1908
 2nd ed. 1910–1911
 3rd ed. 1923–1924
 Index
 4th ed. 1933–1935

Reviews 
First edition
  B. M. Davis. Handbook of systemic botany. Botanical Gazette. Vol. 32, No. 1 (July, 1901), pp. 61-62 Part 1
 Charles J. Chamberlain. Handbook of systemic botany. Botanical Gazette. Vol. 37, No. 1 (Jan., 1904), pp. 68-69 Part 2
 Charles J. Chamberlain. Wettstein's Handbuch. Botanical Gazette. Vol. 45, No. 1 (Jan., 1908), p. 58 Part 3
Second edition
 Charles J. Chamberlain. Wettstein's Handbuch. Botanical Gazette. Vol. 52, No. 5 (Nov., 1911), p. 405 

system, Wettstein